In June 2013, Ireland toured North America, playing test matches against Canada and the United States. The tour was part of the second year of the global rugby calendar established by World Rugby (known as the International Rugby Board prior to November 2014), which will run until 2019, with Ireland helping to expand Test opportunities for Tier 2 nations in 2013.

Fixtures

Matches

United States

Notes:
This match set a record attendance for a United States home game.

Canada

Notes:
This match set a record attendance for a rugby match on Canadian soil.

Touring squad
Caps and ages are to first test date, 8 June

Notes
Pre tour and post 2013 Six Nations Championship, the then head coach Declan Kidney, was sacked from his role as head coach of Ireland. Leinster's head coach Joe Schmidt was named as Kidney's replacement, but will be unable to fill the role for Ireland's Summer Tour. Therefore, assistant head coach Les Kiss, was named as interim head coach for the Summer Tour to Canada and United States.

The initial squad was named on 19 May 2014, with Rory Best as captain. It was a significantly weaker squad due to a number of regular Irish players in the British & Irish Lions squad for their 2013 tour to Australia. The squad then lost their original captain, Rory Best, on 26 May, due to a call to the Lions squad. Peter O'Mahony was named as his replacement in terms of captaincy, and Seán Cronin filled the void left in the hookers. Ahead of the test against Canada, Ireland then lost Simon Zebo to the Lions. Zebo who has started in the test against the United States, was not replaced.

References

Ireland national rugby union team tours
Rugby union tours of Canada
Rugby union tours of the United States
Ireland tour
Ireland tour
Ireland tour